Collix leuciota is a moth in the family Geometridae. It was described by Prout in 1929. It is found in India (Sikkim) and Peninsular Malaysia.

References

leuciota
Moths described in 1929
Taxa named by Louis Beethoven Prout
Moths of Asia
Moths of Malaysia